Zbigņevs Stankevičs (born 15 February 1955) is a Latvian prelate of the Catholic Church. He has been metropolitan Archbishop of Riga since 2010. He previously served as Spiritual Director and Director of the Seminary Institute of Religious Sciences in Riga.

Ecclesiastical career
Stankevičs was born in Lejasciems into a family of Polish descent. In 1978, he obtained the Diploma in Engineering at the Riga Polytechnical Institute. He worked for 12 years prior to pursuing religious studies, first at a naval centre and then at a bank. At that time, he was Vice President of the 'Polish Union of Latvia'. After the fall of communism in Europe and the restoration of Latvian independence he entered the seminary in 1990 in Lublin, Poland. He studied philosophy and theology at the Catholic University of Lublin, receiving a Masters in Theology in 1996. He was ordained a priest on 16 June 1996 for the archdiocese of Riga.

After ordination he held the following positions: assistant priest of St Francis Parish in Riga (1996–2001), chaplain of the Missionary Sisters of Charity (1996–1999), Assistant Community charismatic "Effata", Spiritual Director Major Seminary of Riga (1999–2001).

From 2002 to 2008 he completed his studies in Rome at the Pontifical Lateran University, where he obtained his licentiate and doctorate summa cum laude in Fundamental Theology. During his stay in Rome, he was Director of the Blessed Pius IX Residence of the Pontifical Lateran University. In 2008, he became spiritual director of the Riga Major Seminary, director of the Institute of Religious Studies and assistant priest of Christ the King Parish in Riga.

In addition to Latvian and Polish, he also speaks Lithuanian, Russian, Italian and English, and knows French and German.

Pope Benedict XVI appointed him metropolitan Archbishop of Riga on 19 June 2010. He was consecrated a bishop on 8 August 2010 by Cardinal Pujats, assisted by Archbishop Luigi Bonazzi, the apostolic nuncio to the Baltic states, and by Archbishop Józef Kowalczyk, the primate of Poland. The ceremony was held in the Evangelical Lutheran cathedral in Riga, which had been the Catholic cathedral prior to the Protestant Reformation, because the current seat of the Catholic Archdiocese, St. James Cathedral, was too small to accommodate invited dignitaries, including Latvian president Valdis Zatlers. He was installed in the Cathedral of St. James on 21 August. Cardinal Joachim Meisner, Archbishop of Cologne, also attended.

On 12 June 2012 he was appointed a member of the Pontifical Council for Promoting Christian Unity for a five-year renewable term.

In October 2015, he attended the Synod of Bishops on the Family as the elected representative of the Episcopal Conference of Latvia.

See also
Roman Catholic Church of Latvia

References

External links

Jauns Rīgas arhibīskaps Romas katoļu Baznīcā
Jaunā Romas katoļu arhibīskapa – metropolīta Z. Stankeviča konsekrācija
Iesvētīts jaunais arhibīskaps – metropolīts Zbigņevs Stankevičs
Rīgas arhidiecēzes arhibīskaps – metropolīts Zbigņevs Stankevičs

1955 births
Living people
People from Gulbene Municipality
Pontifical Lateran University alumni
21st-century Roman Catholic archbishops in Latvia
Archbishops of Riga
Riga Technical University alumni
Latvian people of Polish descent